The name Crépeau is derived from a Latin word Latin crispus and an Old French word cresp, crespe ("fuzzy hair").

People

Crépeau
Michel Crépeau is a French politician and attorney, former mayor of La Rochelle.
Paul-André Crépeau was a Canadian professor born in 1926, in Saskatchewan - died 2011.
Armand-Charles Crépeau, former member of Legislative Assembly of Sherbrooke.
Karine Crépeau
 Claude Crépeau, cryptographer, Canada, McGill University.
Paul-André Crépeau, member of the Royal Society of Canada.
François Crépeau, director of scientific affairs of the Centre d'études et de recherches internationales de l'Université de Montréal.

Crépeaux
Robert Crépeaux

Crépault 
Claude Crépault

See also
The médiathèque Michel-Crépeau, is a library opened in 1998 in La Rochelle and named after Michel Crépeau.
Crapo (disambiguation)

French-language surnames